Cooper DeJean (born February 9, 2003) is an American football defensive back for the Iowa Hawkeyes.

High school career
DeJean attended OABCIG High School in Ida Grove, Iowa. He played quarterback and defensive back in high school and holds numerous school records. As a senior, he passed for 3,447 yards with 35 touchdowns and rushed for 1,235 yards and 24 touchdowns. DeJean was the 2021 All-American Bowl adidas Player of the Year. In the state title game, DeJean made several impact plays as OABCIG defeated Van Meter. In a two minute span, DeJean recorded two tackles, returned a punt 14 yards, completed two passes for 52 yards, rushed three times for 22 yards and scored two touchdowns and a two-point conversion.

DeJean also played basketball, baseball and ran track in high school. In basketball, his 1,832 career points rank him behind Iowa and NFL tight end T.J. Hockenson and 55 ahead of NBA player Harrison Barnes on the state’s all-time scoring list. DeJean had the fastest 100-yard dash of any runner in the state during his senior year.

Despite his athletic record and four-star status, DeJean had limited offers coming out of high school. He would choose playing defense at Iowa over playing quarterback at South Dakota State.

College career
As a true freshman at Iowa in 2021, DeJean played in seven games, mostly on special teams, and had four tackles. He became a starter his sophomore year in 2022. DeJean played cornerback, cash (a hybrid linebacker/safety position), punt returner for the Hawkeyes in 2022, in addition to playing safety in the preseason. Against Wisconsin, DeJean showcased his versatility, intercepting a Graham Mertz pass and returning it 32 yards for a touchdown, recording 10 tackles, forcing a fumble, downing a punt on the one yardline, and returning four punts for 82 yards, setting up a short Iowa touchdown drive. Through three quarters, DeJean was outgaining the Hawkeye offense. DeJean was named the MVP of the 2022 Music City Bowl after collecting 7 tackles (one for a loss), returning an interception 14 yards for a touchdown, returning three punts for 42 yards, and downing a punt on the 2 yard line.

References

External links
Iowa Hawkeyes bio

2003 births
Living people
Sportspeople from Sioux Falls, South Dakota
Players of American football from South Dakota
American football cornerbacks
American football safeties
Iowa Hawkeyes football players